Kim Clijsters was the defending champion, and successfully defended her title by defeating compatriot Justine Henin-Hardenne 5–7, 6–4, 6–2 in the final.

Seeds
The first four seeds received a bye into the second round.

Draw

Finals

Top half

Bottom half

References
 Official Results Archive (ITF)
 Official Results Archive (WTA)

Porsche Tennis Grand Prix - Singles
2003 Singles